Kincardine is a municipality located on the shores of Lake Huron in Bruce County in the province of Ontario, Canada.  The current municipality was created in 1999 by the amalgamation of the Town of Kincardine, the Township of  Kincardine, and the Township of Bruce.

The municipality had a population of 11,389 in the Canada 2016 Census.

Communities 
In addition to the main population centre of Kincardine itself (population 6,725), the municipality also contains the smaller communities of Armow, Baie du Dore, Bervie, Glammis, Inverhuron, Millarton, North Bruce, Tiverton, and Underwood.

History 

In 1998, the Village of Tiverton lost its separate incorporation, and became part of the Township of Bruce.

The Town of Kincardine, the Township of Kincardine, and the Township of Bruce were then amalgamated to form the Township of Kincardine-Bruce-Tiverton on January 1, 1999, with boundaries identical to those of the municipality that had existed in 1855.  After the first election of the new municipal council, a plebiscite was conducted, and the name changed to the Municipality of Kincardine.

Historic sites
Kincardine has designated a number of historic sites, per the Ontario Heritage Act.  These include (with local law numbers and listing dates):
Madison House (#4641), also known as 343 Durham Market Square, designated in 1985, a Second Empire house with elements of Italianate style.
490 Broadway (#1988-56;  August 18, 1988)
1558 Concession 12 (#2008-174; October 2008), stone house built in 1885
315 Durham Market Square (#4322; November 20, 1980), Italianate house built c.1860
335 Durham Market Square (#4748; July 17, 1986), mortise and tenon-jointed beamed house built in 1868
338 Durham Market Square (#2004-009; June 1, 2004), Victorian house with grey brick and pink mortar, with rose, shamrock and thistle pattern in windows
(numerous more)
727 Queen Street (#4381; September 3, 1981), the Kincardine Library Building, built in 1908, stone and red brick, Romanesque Revival in style.
780 Queen Street (#4279; April 17, 1980), built in 1881
786 Queen Street (#4280; April 17, 1980), two-storey commercial block built in 1881
788 Queen Street (#4278; April 17, 1980)
789 Queen Street (#4667; May 16, 1985)
1083 Queen Street

Government

Council
The municipal government is overseen by a council of nine. The council includes a mayor elected at large, a deputy mayor elected at large, two councillors elected from Ward 1 (the former Town of Kincardine), one from Ward 2 (the former Township of Kincardine), one from Ward 3 (the former Township of Bruce). Three additional councillors are elected at large.

The 2022–2026 council consists of:
Kenneth Craig, Mayor
Andrea Clarke, Deputy Mayor
Rory Cavanagh, Councillor At Large
Mike Hinchberger, Councillor at Large
Jennifer Prenger, Councillor at Large
Beth Blackwell, Councillor Ward 1
Bill Stewart, Councillor Ward 2
Amanda Steinhoff-Gray, Councillor Ward 3

Municipal departments

Building & Planning
Bylaw Enforcement
Clerks Department
Chief Administration Office
Emergency Management
Fire Department
Information Technologies
Treasury Department
Parks & Recreation
Public Works
 Economic Development  (Penetangore Regional Economic Development Corporation (PREDC))

Climate
Kincardine has a humid continental climate (Köppen Dfb) with cold, snowy winters and warm summers.

Demographics 

Mother tongue (2016 census):
 English as first language: 90.1%
 French as first language: 1.5%
 English and French as first language: 0.3%
 Other as first language: 8.1%

Education 

The Bluewater District School Board is the school board for the Kincardine area, and Kincardine District Secondary School is the local high school for most students. Approximately 800 students attended in the 2007/2008 year. There are five local elementary schools: Elgin Market Public School, Huron Heights Public School, St. Anthony's Catholic School, Kincardine Township-Tiverton Public School (located in Kincardine Township), and Ripley Huron Community School (located in Ripley).

Transportation 

Kincardine is centrally located along Highway 21 and at the west end of Highway 9. There are two taxi companies in Kincardine. Kincardine Taxi and Fred's Cabs. Kincardine Municipal Airport is a modern full-featured airport which can accommodate traffic ranging from light jets to rotary wing aircraft. The town  also has a harbour on Lake Huron for tourists who want to travel by watercraft.

Industry 

The economy of Kincardine is dominated by the Bruce Nuclear Power Development since the 1970s, which is currently operated by Bruce Power, a private company under lease from Ontario Power Generation.

Ontario Power Generation's Deep Geologic Repository for low and intermediate-level waste at the plant has been planned since 2001 and is awaiting federal approval.

Since 2016, 7ACRES has been expanding its employment numbers. It's estimated to have 300 employees by 2019.

There is also a thriving tourist industry, centered on its sandy beaches and Scottish cultural tradition.

Healthcare 

The Kincardine and District General Hospital of the South Bruce Grey Health Centre is the hospital for the community. Further, the Kincardine Family Health Team, a Ministry of Health & Long-Term Care Initiative is located in the community offering programs and services surrounding health promotion and disease prevention. The Kincardine Family Health Team has locations in the Municipality of Kincardine and Township of Huron-Kinloss.

Recreation 

Kincardine is home to many parks and trails that run throughout the town of Kincardine. Sports are a huge part of the community mostly focusing around hockey in the winter and soccer in the summer. The local community centre, The Davidson Centre is the central location for most recreation activities as it has a park, skate park, soccer fields, track (indoor & outdoor), swimming pool, gym, basketball court and hockey rink. There is also the Tiverton Sports Arena.

Sports teams 

The Kincardine Bulldogs is the local hockey team. They compete in the Western Junior C hockey league. In the 2006–2007 and the 2007–2008 seasons the Bulldogs finished 1st in the WJCHL.

All other hockey teams in town go under the name of "The Kincardine Kinucks".

Culture and events 
Kincardine has a strong Scottish culture. The Kincardine Scottish Pipe Band Parades happens every Saturday night during the summer months ending Labour Day weekend. Also every night in the summer (except for Saturdays) the Phantom Piper (a bag piper) plays his bagpipes on top of the light house at sunset. To continue the Scottish culture, every year Kincardine holds the Kincardine Scottish Festival & Highland Games.

Showcasing Kincardine's artistic side, Kincardine is also home to Sundown Theatre (Summer Performance Company), Bluewater Summer Playhouse (Drama Festival) and The Kincardine Summer Music Festival. Kincardine also takes part in Doors Open Kincardine showcasing Kincardine's heritage homes and buildings. Every Monday Starting on the May long weekend until the labour day weekend Kincardine has a "Market in the Square" a sort of flea market in the local park located beside the downtown.

Attractions

Kincardine Lighthouse and museum are located on Harbour Street, as well as a building constructed in 1877 which has served as a bank, a barristers and solicitors office, a newspaper office, a doctor's office, a private residence, and a restaurant. The building is architecturally significant for its intricate brick work design around the windows and parapet. Paddy Walker House, the oldest building in Kincardine, is now a museum. Beaches in Kincardine include Tiny Tot beach, Station Beach (Reunion Park), and Boiler Beach. There are two piers attached to the marina, with the South Pier used for "cliff-jump" style swimming.

Media
Kincardine has two newspaper companies, Kincardine News and the Kincardine Independent. The Kincardine Times, an online newspaper, is a third source of local news. Kincardine also has its own radio station, CIYN-FM.

Notable people
Samuel Andreyev, composer
Paul Henderson, NHL hockey player
Andrew Malcolm, furniture manufacturer and MPP in the Legislative Assembly of Ontario
James Malcolm, Member of Parliament of Canada and Minister of Trade and Commerce
Malcolm McKenzie, Canadian politician, Liberal Member of Alberta's first Legislature 1909 - 1913
Kevin Pollock, NHL referee
Graham Ragsdale, Canadian Forces sniper
Pat Riggin, NHL goaltender
Jessica Stam, supermodel
Jordan Willis, NHL goaltender 
Johnny Wilson, NHL forward
Brenley MacEachern, Juno-nominated singer, member of music duo Madison Violet

See also
List of townships in Ontario

References

External links

 
Populated places on Lake Huron in Canada
Lower-tier municipalities in Ontario
Municipalities in Bruce County